The Midlands (also referred to as Central England) are a part of England that broadly correspond to the Kingdom of Mercia of the Early Middle Ages, bordered by Wales, Northern England, Southern England and the North Sea. The Midlands were important in the Industrial Revolution of the 18th and 19th centuries. They are split into the West Midlands and East Midlands. The region's biggest city, Birmingham often considered the social, cultural, financial and commercial centre of the Midlands, is the second-largest city and metropolitan area in the United Kingdom.

Other major towns and cities of the Midlands, with a population of 100,000 or more include Coventry, Derby, Leicester, Lincoln, Mansfield, Northampton, Nottingham, Solihull, Stoke-on-Trent, Sutton Coldfield, Telford, Wolverhampton and Worcester. The Midlands also includes the smaller cathedral cities of Hereford and Lichfield.

Symbolism

A saltire (diagonal cross) may have been used as a symbol of Mercia as early as the reign of Offa. By the 13th century, the saltire had become the attributed arms of the Kingdom of Mercia. The arms are blazoned Azure, a saltire Or, meaning a gold (or yellow) saltire on a blue field. The saltire is used as both a flag and a coat of arms. As a flag, it is flown from Tamworth Castle, the ancient seat of the Mercian kings.

The flag also appears on street signs welcoming people to Tamworth, the "ancient capital of Mercia". It was also flown outside Birmingham Council House during 2009 while the Staffordshire Hoard was on display in the city before being taken to the British Museum in London. The cross has been incorporated into a number of coats of arms of Midlands towns, including Tamworth, Leek and Blaby. It was recognised as the Mercian flag by the Flag Institute in 2014.

Extent
There is no single definition for the Midlands. If defined as being made up of the statistical regions of East Midlands and West Midlands, it includes the counties of Derbyshire, Herefordshire, Leicestershire, most of Lincolnshire (with the exception of North and North East Lincolnshire), Northamptonshire, Nottinghamshire, Rutland, Shropshire, Staffordshire, Warwickshire, Worcestershire and the West Midlands metropolitan boroughs. If not following the official regional boundaries, the Midlands may also include Peterborough (historically part of Northamptonshire), Finningley (historically part of Nottinghamshire), and the aforementioned boroughs of Lincolnshire.

Additionally, there is an informal region known as the South Midlands which is considered to include the southern parts of the East Midlands and northern parts of Southern England. Conversely, although the northern parts of Derbyshire and Nottinghamshire are officially part of the Midlands, they are often considered to be in Northern England, with northern Derbyshire (areas of which were historically in Cheshire) lying close to the cities of Sheffield and Manchester, and northern Nottinghamshire lying close to Sheffield. However, they are included in the North Midlands informal region which covers the northern parts of the West and East Midlands, along with some southern parts of Northern England.

Divisions
The West Midlands and East Midlands regions are NUTS 1 statistical regions and were formerly constituencies of the European Parliament. Local government in the Midlands is as follows:

Boroughs: (1) Birmingham, (2) Coventry, (3) Derby, (4) Dudley, (5) Leicester, (6) Nottingham, (7) Sandwell, (8) Stoke-on-Trent, (9) Solihull, (10) Telford and Wrekin, (11) Walsall and (12) Wolverhampton.
Shires: 
(13) Derbyshire (Districts: (a) Amber Valley, (b) Bolsover, (c) Chesterfield, (d) Derbyshire Dales, (e) Erewash, (f) High Peak, (g) North East Derbyshire and (h) South Derbyshire)
(14) Herefordshire (Districts: none)
(15) Leicestershire (Districts: (a) Blaby, (b) Charnwood, (c) Harborough, (d) Hinckley and Bosworth, (e) Melton, (f) North West Leicestershire and (g) Oadby and Wigston)
(16) Lincolnshire (Districts: (a) Boston, (b) East Lindsey, (c) Lincoln, (d) North Kesteven, (e) South Holland, (f) South Kesteven and (g) West Lindsey)
 (17acdg) North Northamptonshire (Districts: none)
 (18) Nottinghamshire (Districts: (a) Ashfield, (b) Bassetlaw, (c) Broxtowe, (d) Gedling, (e) Mansfield, (f) Newark and Sherwood and (g) Rushcliffe)
 (19) Rutland (Districts: none)
 (20) Shropshire (Districts: none)
 (21) Staffordshire (Districts: (a) Cannock Chase, (b) East Staffordshire, (c) Lichfield, (d) Newcastle-under-Lyme, (e) South Staffordshire, (f) Stafford, (g) Staffordshire Moorlands and (h) Tamworth)
 (22) Warwickshire (Districts: (a) North Warwickshire, (b) Nuneaton and Bedworth, (c) Rugby, (d) Stratford-on-Avon and (e) Warwick)
 (17bef) West Northamptonshire (Districts: none)
 (23) Worcestershire (Districts: (a) Bromsgrove, (b) Malvern Hills, (c) Redditch, (d) Worcester, (e) Wychavon and (f) Wyre Forest).

The unitary authorities of North Lincolnshire and North East Lincolnshire (not shown), while classed as part of the ceremonial county of Lincolnshire, actually come under the Yorkshire and the Humber region and are therefore not in the officially recognised East Midlands region.

The largest Midlands conurbation, which includes the cities of Birmingham and Wolverhampton, is roughly covered by the metropolitan county of the West Midlands (which also includes the city of Coventry); with the related City Region extending into neighbouring areas of Shropshire, Staffordshire, Warwickshire and Worcestershire.

Various parts of the Midlands, particularly Warwickshire and Leicestershire, are on occasion referred to as the Heart of England, especially in tourist literature given that the geographic centre of England is generally considered to lie within this arc.

Different areas of the Midlands have their own distinctive character, giving rise to many local history and industrial heritage groups. Nottingham played a notable part in the English Civil War, which is commemorated in a number of place names (Parliament Terrace, Parliament Street, Standard Hill). Areas such as Derbyshire's Amber Valley and Erewash combine attractive countryside with industrial heritage and are home to historic canals and sites associated with the mining industry. The Black Country, broadly the boroughs of Dudley, Sandwell, Wolverhampton and Walsall, played an important part in the Industrial Revolution.

Historic counties

The historic counties ceased to be used for any administrative purpose in 1899 but remain important to some people, notably for county cricket.

Geography
The area is predominantly low-lying and flat apart from isolated hills such as Turners Hill within the Black Country conurbation at 271 m (889 ft) and the Wrekin just south of Wellington in Telford at 407 m (1,335 ft). Upland areas lie in the west and north of the region with the Shropshire Hills to the west, close to the England–Wales border and the Peak District area of the southern Pennines in the north of the region. The Shropshire Hills reach a height of 540 m (1,771 ft) at Brown Clee Hill and includes the Long Mynd, Clee Hills and Stiperstones ridge. The Peak District reaches heights of between 300 m (1,000 ft) and 600 m (2,000 ft); Kinder Scout is the highest point at 636 m (2,086 ft). Further south, the Welsh border reaches over 700 m (2,000 ft) high, at Twyn Llech (Black Mountain), which at 703 m (2,306 ft) is thus the highest point in Herefordshire.

The Precambrian Malverns are formed of some of the oldest rock in England (dating from the Cryogenian period, at around 680 million years old) and extend for  through two West Midlands counties (Worcestershire and Herefordshire) as well as northern Gloucestershire in the southwest. The highest point of the hills is the Worcestershire Beacon at 425 m (1,394 ft) above sea level (OS Grid reference SO768452).

Lincolnshire is also the only coastal county in the Midlands as the region is bordered by Wales to the west.

The Cotswolds – designated an AONB in 1966. – extend for over  through Oxfordshire, Gloucestershire, Wiltshire, Somerset, Warwickshire, and Worcestershire. They reach a highest point of 330 m (1,082 ft) at Cleeve Hill.

Areas of lower hills, in the range 200 m (600 ft) - 300 m (1000 ft), include Charnwood Forest in Leicestershire, Cannock Chase in Staffordshire, and the Lincolnshire Wolds (100 m (300 ft) - 200 m (600 ft)); the latter having some prominence despite their modest altitude given their location in typically low-lying Lincolnshire near to the east coast.

Climate
The Midlands has a temperate maritime climate, with cold, cloudy, wet winters and comfortable, mostly dry, mostly sunny summers. The temperature usually ranges from  during winter nights to  during summer days. Due to its geographical location, which is furthest away from the coast than anywhere else in England, it typically receives mostly light winds, with warm days and cold nights. The previous day had a maximum of only , also in Pershore.

See also
 Subdivisions of England

References

Further reading
 Allen, R.C.  Enclosure and the Yeoman: the Agricultural Development of the South Midlands 1450-1850 (Oxford UP, 1992)
 Beckett, John V. The East Midlands from AD 1000 (Addison-Wesley Longman, 1988).
 Bennett, Michael J. "Sir Gawain and the green knight and the literary achievement of the north-west Midlands: the historical background." Journal of Medieval History 5.1 (1979): 63–88.
 Betteridge, Alan. Deep Roots, Living Branches: A History of Baptists in the English Western Midlands (Troubador Publishing Ltd, 2010).
 Dewindt, Edwin Brezett, and Edwin Brezette DeWindt. Land and people in Holywell-cum-Needingworth: structures of tenure and patterns of social organization in an East Midlands village, 1252-1457 (PIMS, 1972).
 Donnelly, Tom, Jason Begley, and Clive Collis. "The West Midlands automotive industry: the road downhill." Business History 59.1 (2017): 56-74 online.
 Finberg, H.P.R. The early charters of the West Midlands (Leicester University Press, 1972).
 Gelling, Margaret. The West Midlands in the Early Middle Ages (Leicester UP, 1992).
 Hilton, R. H. A Medieval Society: The West Midlands at the End of the Thirteenth Century (1987) online review
 Jones, Peter M. Industrial Enlightenment: Science, technology and culture in Birmingham and the West Midlands, 1760–1820 (2017) online.
 Laughton, Jane, Evan Jones, and Christopher Dyer. "The urban hierarchy in the later Middle Ages: a study of the East Midlands." Urban history (2001): 331–357.
 McWhirr, A. L. A. N. The Early Military History of the Roman East Midlands (1970) online.
 Money, John. "Birmingham and the West Midlands, 1760-1793: Politics and Regional Identity in the English Provinces in the Later Eighteenth Century." Midland History 1.1 (1971): 1–19.
 Money, John. Experience and Identity: Birmingham and the West Midlands, 1760-1800 (Manchester University Press, 1977).
 Rowlands, Marie B. The West Midlands from AD 1000 (3 vol, Longman, 1987).
 Somerset, Alan. "New Historicism: Old History Writ Large? Carnival, Festivity and Popular Culture in the West Midlands." Medieval & Renaissance Drama in England 5 (1991): 245–255. online
 Stafford, Pauline. The East Midlands in the Early Middle Ages ( Leicester University, 1985).
 Stobart, Jon. "Regions, Localities, and Industrialisation: Evidence from the East Midlands Circa 1780–1840." Environment and Planning A 33.7 (2001): 1305–1325.
 Tompkins, Matthew. Peasant society in a midlands manor, Great Horwood 1400-1600 (PhD Diss. U of Leicester, 2006) online.
 Townsend, Claire. "County versus region? Migrational connections in the East Midlands, 1700–1830." Journal of Historical Geography 32.2 (2006): 291–312.

Regions of England
The Midlands
The Midlands